= Trinity Church, Troitskoye =

Trinity Church
- Церковь Святой Троицы
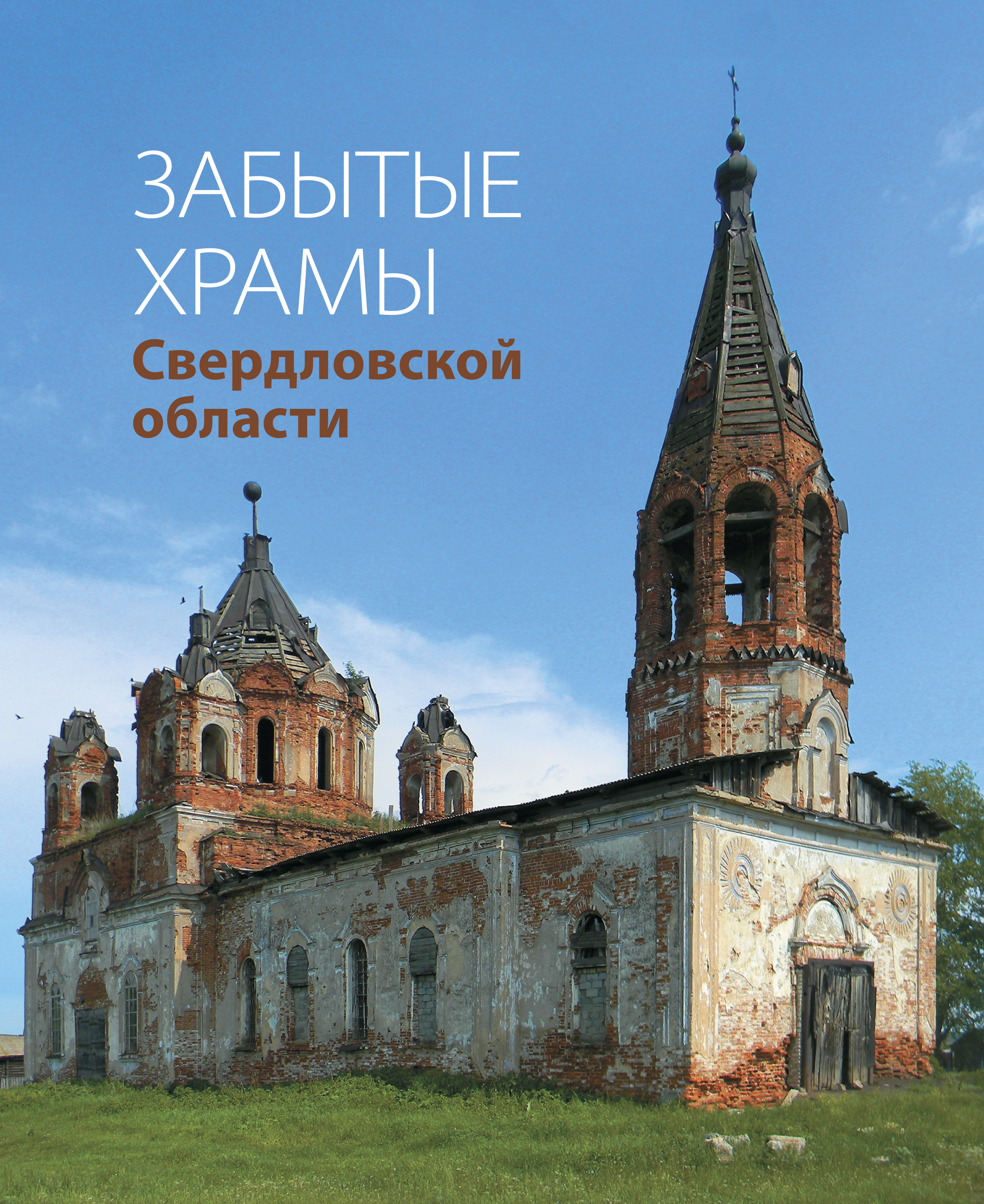
- Interactive map of the Trinity Church area

General information
- Architectural style: Eclecticism
- Location: Troitskoye
- Coordinates: 56°23′01″N 61°24′52″E

Trinity Church is an Orthodox church in the village of Troitskoye, Sverdlosk. Today the church is defunct.

The building was granted the status of regional significance on 31 December 1987 (decision No. 535 by the executive committee of the Sverdlovsk oblast's Council of People's Deputies). The object number of cultural heritage of regional significance is 661710759370005.

== History ==
It was one of the first churches in the area of the drainage basin of the Iset River. A wooden church was raised several times. A wooden two-altars church was built in 1680 but destroyed by fire in 1787. There is no data about the architect and authors of the construction plan of the building. Three years later a new building was built. It also burnt down in 1800. Fire destroyed property and documents of the parish, only part of the archive of the income-expenditure books from 1751 to 1791 survived.

It was decided to build a stone church. In 1801 the foundation of the stone church was laid. On 19 March 1808 one of the side-altars was consecrated in the name of the Venerable Savvatii Solovetsky. The main church was consecrated on 14 July 1823 in honor of the Holy Trinity.

In 1850 in the vault of the belltower was cracked. There was a threat of collapse. The building was rebuilt. During the reconstruction one more side-altar was attached. On 12 December 1854 a new side-altar was consecrated in honor of the icon of the Most Holy Theotokos. During the period of 1875-1880s the main part of the church was expanded and rebuilt. The construction plan was made by the engineer-technologist Pavel Fedorovich Golyshev. The main church was consecrated on 27 September 1880; and the side-altars - on 15 November 1881 and on 20 February 1886.

The church was closed in 1932, during the Soviet era the building served as a warehouse. At present time the church is not being restored.

== Architecture ==
The church has three altars. On one axis there is a church with a faceted apse, a refectory and a bell tower. The church is crowned with a five-domed structure, a tent on a faceted drum and decorative chapters from small tents on rectangular pedestals in the corners of the four-storeyed chapel. All premises of the church are also located on the same axis: a door from a covered porch, a refectory hall type, a summer temple. At the corners of the four-legged pylons, which support the dome arches and sails. The Trinity Church was executed by regional architects in the manner of the master.
